Cave Springs Public Schools is a K–12 school in rural, southwestern Adair County, Oklahoma.  It was founded in 1926 by the consolidation of 3 K-8 schools and was originally named Union Grade School, often abbreviated as UG.  In the late 1940s, the school's name was changed to Cave Springs, the mascot was changed from the Indians to the Hornets and the colors from red and white to green and white.  Cave Springs is 2½ miles north of Bunch, Oklahoma. The photograph at right is of the library, the oldest building on campus.

For the 2006–2007 school year, the Cave Springs School District had 216 students enrolled—99 elementary students and 117 high school students. Per the 2005 School Report Card issued by the Education Oversight Board, the high school had 12 teachers teaching a student body consisting of 88% American Indian and 12% White with a graduation rate of 88.2%. The elementary school had 10 teachers. The elementary students were 93% American Indian and 7% White, with 42.4% in special education.

See also
Cave Springs High School

References

External links

School districts in Oklahoma
Education in Adair County, Oklahoma
1926 establishments in Oklahoma
School districts established in 1926